Scopula zophodes is a moth of the family Geometridae first described by Louis Beethoven Prout in 1935. It is found in South Africa.

See also
List of moths of South Africa (Geometridae)

References

Bibliography
Vári, L.; Kroon, D. M. & Krüger, M. (2002). Classification and Checklist of the Species of Lepidoptera Recorded in Southern Africa. Simple Solutions, Chatswood Australia.

Endemic moths of South Africa
Moths described in 1935
zophodes
Moths of Africa
Taxa named by Louis Beethoven Prout